This article concerns the period 579 BC – 570 BC.

Events and trends
579 BC—Servius Tullius succeeds the assassinated Lucius Tarquinius Priscus as the sixth King of Rome (traditional date).
575 BC—The Ishtar Gate and throne room wall are built in the city of Babylon.
575 BC—Battle of Yanling: The army of the Chinese State of Jin defeats the forces of the State of Chu in ancient Henan province.
575 BC–550 BC—Temples and public buildings begin to grace Rome. The main temple of Jupiter Optimus Maximus is built.
573 BC—The Nemean Games are founded at Nemea (traditional date).
571 BC (25 November)—Servius Tullius, king of Rome, celebrates a triumph for his victory over the Etruscans.
571 BC—Zhou Ling Wang becomes King of the Zhou Dynasty of China.
570 BC—Amasis II succeeds Apries as king of Egypt.
c. 570 BC—The François Vase, a volute krater with black figure decoration, is made by a pair of Greek craftsmen: the potter Ergotimos and the painter Kleitias.
570 BC–560 BC—Berlin Kore, from a cemetery at Keratea, near Athens, is made.

Significant people
576 BC—Birth of Cyrus the Great, later King of Anshan and architect of the First Persian Empire
572 BC—Death of Zhou Jian Wang, King of the Zhou Dynasty of China
570 BC—Birth of Xenophanes
c. 570 BC—Birth of Pythagoras, Greek mathematician, on the island of Samos (died c. 475 BC)
c. 570 BC—Death of Sappho, Greek poet
Ergotimos—potter
Kleitias—painter

References